David Rudovsky (born 1943, Queens, New York) is a civil rights lawyer in Philadelphia.  He is a founding partner, in 1971, of the law firm of Kairys, Rudovsky, Messing, Feinberg and Lin , and a Senior Fellow at University of Pennsylvania Law School, where he teaches evidence and constitutional criminal procedure. In 1996, Rudovsky won Penn's Lindback Award for Teaching Excellence. In 1986 he was named a MacArthur Fellow by the John D. and Catherine T. MacArthur Foundation for creative and ground-breaking work in jail reform and police misconduct litigation.

Rudovsky has twice appeared before the United States Supreme Court.  He represented the plaintiff in Mitchell v. Forsyth, 472 U.S. 511 (1985), which addressed whether a government official could be sued for damages based on his conduct in authorizing a warrantless wiretap for the purpose of gathering intelligence regarding a suspected threat to national security.  The Supreme Court held that the official was immune from suit because his actions had not violated clearly established law.  In addition, Rudovsky represented the plaintiff in City of Canton v. Harris, 489 U.S. 378 (1989), which addressed whether police could be sued for failing to provide medical treatment to an arrestee who had fallen down while in police custody and allegedly had suffered "emotional ailments" as a result.  The Supreme Court held that the plaintiff had not proven deliberate indifference by the police to the plaintiff's medical condition, and therefore had not established that they were liable for damages.

In 2009, Rudovsky and his co-author, Widener University Law School Professor Leonard Sosnov (previously and subsequently an appellate public defender in Philadelphia), sued West Publishing Company over the company's issuance of a "2008-2009 pocket part" (update) to the authors' 1991 treatise on Pennsylvania criminal procedure. In prior years, the two authors had prepared annual supplements but for that year had not agreed on terms with the publisher, and so did not prepare one. When West issued a pocket part under Rudovsky and Sosnov's names anyway, which the authors considered grossly deficient, they brought suit. A jury ruled in favor of Rudovsky and Sosnov, awarding compensatory and punitive damages. Following a grant of remittitur, the case was settled on appeal on undisclosed terms.

References

Works
Michael Avery, Karen Blum and David Rudovsky, Police Misconduct: Law and Litigation (Clark Boardman Co., 2006, 3rd ed.).
David Rudovsky, Alan Bronstein and Ed. Koren, The Rights of Prisoners (1990).
Human Rights in Northern Ireland (Helsinki Watch, 1991, with Norman Dorsen and Lois Whitman).
The Law of Arrest, Search and Seizure in Pennsylvania (PBR Press, 2005, 3rd ed.).
“Running in Place: The Paradox of Expanding Rights and Restricted Remedies, “ 2005 Ill. L. Rev. 1199 (2005).
David Rudovsky and Leonard Sosnov, Pennsylvania Criminal Procedure: Law, Commentary and Forms (West Group 2001, 2nd ed.).
“Law Enforcement By Stereotypes and Serendipity: Racial Profiling and Searches Without Cause,” 3 U.Pa.J. of Const. Law 296 (2001).
The Impact of the War on Drugs on Procedural Fairness and Racial Equality, 1994 Univ. of Chicago L. Forum 237 (1994).
Police Abuse: Can The Violence Be Contained?, 27 Harvard Civil Rights - Civil Liberties L. Rev. 465 (1992).
Crime, Law Enforcement, and Constitutional Rights, in A Less Than Perfect Union, Jules Lobel, ed. (1988).
Criminal Justice: The Accused, in Our Endangered Rights, Norman Dorsen, ed. (1984).
The Criminal Justice System and the Role of the Supreme court, The Politics of Law, David Kairys, ed. (Pantheon, 1990).
John Gray and David Rudovsky, The Court Acknowledges the Illegitimate, 118 U. Pa. L. Rev. 1 (1969).
The Right to Counsel Under Attack, 136 U. Pa. L. Rev. 1965 (1988).
The Qualified Immunity Doctrine in the Supreme Court: Judicial Activism and the Restriction of Constitutional Rights, 138 U. Pa. L. Rev. 23 (1989).
Norman Dorsen and David Rudovsky, Some Thoughts on Dissent, Personal Liberty and War, 54 ABA Journal 752 (1968).
Book Review, Judicial First Aid, The Nation, August 17, 1977, p. 153.
Litigating Prison Conditions in Philadelphia, 65 Prison Journal 64 (1985).

External links
University of Pennsylvania Faculty Page

1943 births
Living people
American jurists
MacArthur Fellows
University of Pennsylvania Law School faculty
Scholars of evidence law
American scholars of constitutional law
Scholars of criminal law